Lake Bakhtegan was a salt lake in Fars Province, southern Iran, about  east of Shiraz and  west of the town of Neyriz.

It was fed by the Kor River. The construction of several dams on the Kor River had significantly reduced the water flow into the lake, increased its salinity, and extirpated the lake's populations of flamingos and other migratory birds. Lake Bakhtegan is now completely dry and the living species have either died or moved to other locations.

Description
Lake Bakhtegan, once Iran's second largest lake, was fed mostly by the Kur River, while Lake Tashk was fed by overflow from the marshes at its west end and by a large permanent spring in the northwest.

Despite being naturally segregated by narrow strips of land, they used to join to form a single lake during years of heavy rainfall. Conversely, during drought periods, such as in 1934, 1971, and the following years after 2008, the lakes dry out completely except in the area near the springs. It is worthy to mention that the lakes are completely dry today and the ecosystem has altered permanently.

Supporting more than 20,000 waterfowls during the migration seasons, the lakes are notoriously important for breeding of a wide variety of species and helping to maintain the biological and ecological diversity of the region.

The two lakes, their delta and spring-fed marshes are designated as Wetlands of International Importance by the Ramsar Convention on Wetlands. The Ramsar Convention on Wetlands is an international treaty established in 1971, establishing a framework for the stewardship and preservation of wetlands.

References

External links

 Columbia Encyclopedia entry

Lakes of Iran
Landforms of Fars Province
Saline lakes of Asia